Liptenara schoutedeni is a butterfly in the family Lycaenidae. It is found in the Democratic Republic of the Congo from the south-eastern part of the country to Lualaba.

References

Butterflies described in 1926
Poritiinae
Endemic fauna of the Democratic Republic of the Congo